Lycaste, abbreviated as Lyc. in horticultural trade, is a genus of orchids that contains about 30 species with egg-shaped pseudobulbs and thin, plicate (pleated) leaves.

Description 
Lycaste flowers, like all orchid blooms, have three petals and three sepals.  The petals are typically yellow, white, or orange, and the sepals are yellow, orange, green, or reddish brown.  The petals and sepals may be marked sparsely or densely with red, reddish purple, purple, or reddish brown spots. The lip (ventral petal) may be very similar to the other two petals, as in Lycaste aromatica or Lycaste brevispatha, or colored quite distinctively, as in several subspecies and varieties of Lycaste macrophylla.  Most Lycaste flowers are medium in size, averaging about 5 to 10 cm, but Lycaste schilleriana is 16–18 cm across.  Some Lycaste blooms have a unique fragrance - the scent of Lycaste aromatica has been variously described as cinnamon or clove.  The blooms of the species Lycaste cochleata, Lycaste consobrina, and Lycaste cruenta also have a pleasant scent.

Taxonomy 
The World Checklist of Selected Plant Families, maintained by the Royal Botanic Gardens at Kew, is recognized by the American Orchid Society as the definitive authority on orchid taxonomy. The Checklist currently acknowledges 31 species of Lycaste, 3 natural hybrids, 2 subspecies (and 1 nominate subspecies), and 1 variety. Orchid growers and orchid collectors, who tend to be taxonomic splitters more often than lumpers, recognize additional subspecies and varieties of Lycaste, as well as alba (white) forms of several species.

Sections 
The Lycastes are divided into four sections and two subsections:
Section Deciduosae - deciduous, that is, they usually lose their leaves during an annual dormant period
Subsection Xanthanthae - have yellow to orange blooms; the name comes from xantho (yellow) and anthos (flower)
Subsection Paradeciduosae - have pink-marked white blooms; the name comes from para (similar or near) and deciduosae (deciduous)
Section Longisepalae - has very long sepals
Section Macrophyllae - keep their leaves during dormancy; the name comes from macro (large) and phyllae (leaves)
Section Fimbriatae - typically have fringed lips

All but two of the Deciduosae have spines at the apices of their pseudobulbs, that become exposed when the leaves are dropped. The exceptions are the Xanthanthae species Lycaste lasioglossa and the Paradeciduosae species Lycaste tricolor. Both of these species lack spines, and may bloom when leaves are still present.

List of species by section 

Xanthanthae
Lycaste aromatica
Lycaste bradeorum
Lycaste campbelli
Lycaste cochleata
Lycaste consobrina
Lycaste crinita
Lycaste cruenta
Lycaste deppei
Lycaste lasioglossa
Lycaste macrobulbon

Paradeciduosae
Lycaste brevispatha
Lycaste tricolor

Macrophyllae

Lycaste dowiana
Lycaste leucantha
Lycaste macrophylla
 Lycaste macrophylla var. desboisiana
 Lycaste macrophylla subsp. macrophylla
Lycaste macrophylla subsp. puntarenasensis
Lycaste macrophylla subsp. xanthocheila
Lycaste neglecta
Lycaste powellii
Lycaste skinneri
Lycaste xytriophora

Fimbriatae
Lycaste longipetala
Lycaste mesochlaena

Natural hybrids
Lycaste × groganii (Lycaste aromatica × Lycaste deppei) 
Lycaste × michelii (Lycaste cochleata × Lycaste lasioglossa)
Lycaste × smeeana (Lycaste deppei × Lycaste skinneri)

Hybrids
Angulocaste (Anguloa × Lycaste)
Cochlecaste (Cochleanthes × Lycaste)
Colaste (Colax × Lycaste)
Lycasteria (Bifrenaria × Lycaste)
Lycida (Ida × Lycaste)
Maxillacaste (Lycaste × Maxillaria)
Zygocaste (Lycaste × Zygopetalum)

A 2002 revision of the Lycaste genus moved many species of the section Fimbriatae to a new genus, Ida. The 34 species of Ida occur in South America and the Caribbean Islands (Ida barringtoniae), while true Lycastes occur mostly in Mexico and Central America.  The genus Ida is recognized by the World Checklist of Monocotyledons.

References 

 Well-written web site by Phil Tomlinson on Lycastes and the closely related genus Anguloa; the Lycaste information is based largely on the 1970 monograph by Dr. J. A. Fowlie.
 , search for "Lycaste"
 Fowlie, J. A., 1970: The Genus Lycaste; privately printed
 Dr. Henry F. Oakeley, 1993 : Lycaste Species: The Essential Guide
 Dr. Henry F. Oakeley, 2008 : Lycaste, Ida and Anguloa: The Essential Guide
 A.F.W. (Fred) Alcorn and Michael S. Hallett, 1993. Lycaste orchids : cultivation and hybridisation''

External links 
 
 
 Lycaste
 American Orchid Society culture sheet for Lycaste

 
Maxillariinae genera